Sebastian Krelj, also known as Sebastjan Krelj, Sebastijan Krelj or Boštjan Krelj (1538 – 25 December 1567) was a Slovene Protestant reformer, writer, pastor, linguist  and preacher and regarded as one of the most educated Slovene Protestants of the 16th century.

Life and work
Krelj was born in Vipava, then part of the Duchy of Carniola. He studied at University of Jena and became a follower of the Lutheran preacher and writer Primož Trubar, the leader of the Protestant Reformation in the Slovene Lands, whom he assisted as a preacher in Ljubljana. In 1565, he became superintendent of the Carniolan Protestant Church in Ljubljana. Already at the time of assuming the position, he was suffering from tuberculosis and on Christmas two years later died from it, leaving behind a widow and a child.

Krelj had a wide linguistic and philologic knowledge: besides Slovene, German and Latin, he knew Ancient Greek, Hebrew, Croatian and Glagolitic literature. Krelj put the central dialect into context of dialects spoken by Istrians, the inhabitants of the Vipava Valley and Lower Carniolans. He introduced some changes to the Latin script originally adopted by Trubar from the German. His reforms were taken up by Jurij Dalmatin in the first translation of the entire Bible to the Slovene. In 1583, they were codified by Adam Bohorič in his grammar book .

References

1538 births
1567 deaths
16th-century Carniolan writers
16th-century linguists
16th-century Lutheran clergy
Carniolan philologists
Carniolan Lutherans
Slovenian Lutheran clergy
Protestant Reformers
Translators of the Bible into Slovene
People from Vipava, Vipava
University of Jena alumni
16th-century deaths from tuberculosis
Tuberculosis deaths in Slovenia